Nuvuttiq (ᓄᕗᑦᑎᖅ) formerly Cape Searle is an uninhabited headland located on Qaqaluit Island's northeastern tip, in the Qikiqtaaluk Region of Nunavut, Canada.

It was named by Arctic explorer John Ross on 17 September 1818 in honor of John Clark Searle, Esq., then Chairman of the Victualling board.

Geography
The habitat is characterized by coastal cliffs and rocky marine shores.

Fauna
Cape Searle is home to the largest northern fulmar colony in Canada.

Conservation
It is a Canadian Important Bird Area (#NU003), an International Biological Program site and a Key Terrestrial Bird Habitat site.

References 

Landforms of Baffin Island
Nuvuttiq
Important Bird Areas of Qikiqtaaluk Region
Important Bird Areas of Arctic islands
Seabird colonies